William Crowninshield Endicott (November 19, 1826 – May 6, 1900) was an American politician and Secretary of War in the first administration of President Grover Cleveland (1885–1889).

Early life

Endicott was born in Salem, Massachusetts on November 19, 1826.  He was a son of William Putnam Endicott and Mary (née Crowninshield) Endicott. He was a direct descendant of the Massachusetts governor, John Endecott, and a first cousin three times removed of another Massachusetts governor, Endicott Peabody.

He graduated from Harvard University in 1847 and attended Harvard Law School in 1849–1850.  He studied law with Nathaniel J. Lord prior to his admission to the Massachusetts bar in 1850.

Career
In 1852, he was elected a member of the Salem Common Council and, five years later, became  City Solicitor.  He was elected a member of the American Antiquarian Society in 1862. In 1853, he entered into a law partnership with J. W. Perry under the name Perry & Endicott, which was dissolved in 1873 upon his appointment to the bench. From 1857 to 1873, also served as president of the Salem Bank.

In 1873, Endicott, although a Democrat (and originally a Whig), was appointed by Republican governor William B. Washburn to the Massachusetts Supreme Judicial Court, where he served until 1882.  In 1879, he unsuccessfully ran for Congress, followed by an unsuccessful gubernatorial race in 1884.  Grover Cleveland appointed Endicott Secretary of War and he served in that capacity in the administration between 1885 and 1889. Endicott oversaw many important changes in the organization of the United States Army, including the establishment of a system of examinations to determine the promotion of officers.

Endicott convened and chaired the Board of Fortifications in 1885 (usually called the Endicott Board), which would provide detailed recommendations and designs for the generation of American coastal defense fortifications constructed in the era of the Spanish–American War. Most of these Endicott Period fortifications served through early World War II.

Personal life

On December 13, 1859, Endicott was married to Ellen Peabody (1833–1927) in Salem.  Ellen was the daughter of philanthropist George Peabody  and Clarissa Peabody of Salem.  Her grandfather was the distinguished Salem ship owner, Joseph Peabody, who made a fortune importing pepper from Sumatra and was one of the wealthiest men in the United States at the time of his death in 1900. Together, William and Ellen had two children:

 William Crowninshield Endicott Jr. (1860–1936), a lawyer who married Marie Louise Thoron (1864–1958), daughter of Joseph Thoron and Anna Barker (née Ward) Thoron, in 1889. William C. Endicott Jr. was the president of the Massachusetts Historical Society for ten years.
 Mary Crowninshield Endicott (1864–1957), who married the British statesman Joseph Chamberlain in 1888. After his death, she married the Anglican clergyman William Hartley Carnegie (1859–1936), in 1916.

Endicott died of acute pneumonia in Boston, Massachusetts on May 6, 1900.  His wife lived another twenty-seven years, until her death in Boston on August 20, 1927, after which she was buried with William in the Endicott Lot at Harmony Grove Cemetery in Salem.

References

External links

 Biography in Secretaries of War and Secretaries of the Army a publication of the United States Army Center of Military History.

|-

|-

1826 births
1900 deaths
Crowninshield family
United States Secretaries of War
Politicians from Salem, Massachusetts
Justices of the Massachusetts Supreme Judicial Court
Cleveland administration cabinet members
19th-century American politicians
Massachusetts Democrats
Members of the American Antiquarian Society
Harvard Law School alumni
Burials at Harmony Grove Cemetery
19th-century American judges
Massachusetts Whigs
Peabody family